Juraj Šimek (born 29 September 1987) is a Slovak-born Swiss professional ice hockey player. He is currently playing with GKS Katowice of the Polska Hokej Liga (PHL).

Playing career
Prior to moving to North America, Šimek played in Switzerland between the junior and senior (Nationalliga A and B) leagues with Bern, Kloten, and Biel. After a strong season with Kloten's junior team in 2005–06, posting 68 points in 45 games, Šimek was chosen in the sixth round, 167th overall, by the Vancouver Canucks in the 2006 NHL Entry Draft.

Selected by the Brandon Wheat Kings with their first choice in the 2006 Canadian Hockey League (CHL) Import Draft, Šimek made his North American debut in 2006–07 with the Wheat Kings. He scored at a near point-per-game pace, with 57 points in 58 games and received his first NHL contract in the off-season, on July 23, 2007, with the Canucks.

Signed with the Canucks, he made his AHL debut with Vancouver's minor league affiliate, the Manitoba Moose, in 2007–08 and scored 17 points in 66 games. On October 6, 2008, he was traded along with Lukáš Krajíček to the Tampa Bay Lightning for Michel Ouellet and Shane O'Brien.

On December 9, 2010, Tampa Bay traded Šimek to the Boston Bruins in exchange for minor league forward Levi Nelson.

On October 15, 2019, Genève-Servette HC managed to loan struggling Simek to the SC Rapperswil-Jona Lakers through November 10. It was later announced that Simek would remain with the Lakers for the remainder of the 2019/20 season. 

On April 29, 2020, Simek joined EHC Kloten of the second-tier Swiss League on a one-year deal.

International play
Šimek has played for the Swiss national junior team twice at the World Junior Championships.

Career statistics

Regular season and playoffs

International

References

External links

1987 births
Brandon Wheat Kings players
EHC Biel players
EHC Bülach players
Genève-Servette HC players
HC Lugano players
HC TPS players
Living people
Manitoba Moose players
Norfolk Admirals players
Sportspeople from Prešov
HC 21 Prešov players
Providence Bruins players
SC Rapperswil-Jona Lakers players
Slovak ice hockey right wingers
Swiss ice hockey players
Vancouver Canucks draft picks
Slovak emigrants to Switzerland
Swiss expatriate sportspeople in Finland
Swiss expatriate sportspeople in Poland
Swiss expatriate sportspeople in Canada
Swiss expatriate sportspeople in the United States
Swiss expatriate ice hockey people
Expatriate ice hockey players in Canada
Expatriate ice hockey players in Finland
Expatriate ice hockey players in the United States
Expatriate ice hockey players in Poland